Nasar Sakar Saeed (born January 26, 1978, in Kenya, as Stephen Loruo Kamar) is a Bahraini marathon runner of Kenyan origin. Saeed represented Bahrain at the 2008 Summer Olympics in Beijing, where he competed for the men's marathon, along with his compatriots Abdulhak Zakaria, and Al Mustafa Riyadh. He finished the race in thirty-seventh place by one second ahead of Eritrea's Yonas Kifle, with a time of 2:20:24.

Saeed also achieved his personal best time of 2:10:46, by winning the championship title at the 2006 Xiamen Marathon.

References

External links
 
 NBC 2008 Olympics profile

1978 births
Living people
Bahraini male marathon runners
Bahraini male long-distance runners
Kenyan male marathon runners
Kenyan emigrants to Bahrain
Olympic athletes of Bahrain
Athletes (track and field) at the 2008 Summer Olympics
Naturalized citizens of Bahrain